Pristimantis inusitatus is a species of frog in the family Strabomantidae. It is endemic to Ecuador and known from scattered localities along the eastern slopes of the Andes. Common name barking robber frog has been coined for it.

Etymology
The specific name inusitatus is derived from Latin in- (=negation) and usitatus (="usual" or "common"), meaning "rare or uncommon". The species was described based on three specimens collected from three separate locations.

Description
Males measure  and females  in snout–vent length. The snout is subacuminate in dorsal view and protruding in lateral profile and has a pointed tip. The canthus rostralis is sharp. The tympanum is prominent. Both fingers and toes bear broad discs and have lateral fringes. Dorsal skin is shagreened or smooth; there are large warts laterally. Females are dorsally green. Male coloration varies from green to pinkish brown with dark brown markings. The limbs have faint brown bars. The venter is white.

Habitat and conservation
It occurs in low vegetation near streams. It is threatened by habitat loss caused by agriculture, logging, and human settlement.

References

inusitatus
Amphibians of the Andes
Amphibians of Ecuador
Endemic fauna of Ecuador
Amphibians described in 1980
Taxa named by William Edward Duellman
Taxa named by John Douglas Lynch
Taxonomy articles created by Polbot